"26 Cents", also written as "26¢", is the debut song of the Canadian country music group The Wilkinsons.  Written by group member Steve Wilkinson along with William Wallace, it was released in June 1998 as the first single from their album Nothing but Love.  The song reached number 1 on the RPM Country Tracks chart in August 1998 and number 3 on the U.S. Billboard Hot Country Singles & Tracks chart. It was named both Society of Composers, Authors and Music Publishers of Canada (SOCAN) Song of the Year and Single of the Year at the 1999 Canadian Country Music Association Awards.

Content
The song is about a girl who just turned 18 and is moving away to her own place. The song's title comes from the "penny for your thoughts, a quarter for the call" her mother gives her before she leaves.

Music video
The music video was directed by Jim Shea and premiered in mid-1998.

Chart performance

Year-end charts

Awards and nominations

References

1998 debut singles
1998 songs
The Wilkinsons songs
Giant Records (Warner) singles
Song recordings produced by Doug Johnson (record producer)
Canadian Country Music Association Single of the Year singles
Canadian Country Music Association Song of the Year songs
Songs about telephone calls